Lucie Rault (also known as Lucie Rault-Leyrat) is an eminent ethnomusicologist residing in Paris. She is master of conference in the Museum of Natural History, and was chief of the department of ethnomusicology of the Musée de l'Homme.

Publications 
 La Cithare zheng 520 p., Thèse de doctorat de 3ème cycle, Université de Paris X Nanterre, 1973.
 La Cithare chinoise zheng : un vol d'oies sauvages sur les cordes de soie, Editions du Léopard d'Or, Paris, 318 p. . This work was awarded the Prix Stanislas Julien from the Académie des Inscriptions et Belles Lettres.
 Musiques de la tradition chinoise, (Paris, Actes-Sud/cité de la musique, coll. Musiques du monde, 2000) 18x14 cm, 192 p. + CD (Diapason d'Or recipient)
 Instruments de musique du monde, (Paris, Hervé de La Martinière, coll. Patrimoine, 2000) 25x31cm, pp232,  
 Musical Instruments: A Worldwide Survey of Traditional Music-making Musical Instruments: A Worldwide Survey of Traditional Music-making, Thames & Hudson Ltd (November 6, 2000), 
 Vom Klang der Welt. Vom Echo der Vorfahren zu den Musikinstrumenten der Neuzeit, Frederking & Thaler (2000),

External links
 Lucie Rault - Site de la Société française d'ethnomusicologie
 Lucie Rault - Site Philmultic
 Lucie Rault - site amazon.fr

Living people
Writers from Paris
20th-century French musicologists
Women musicologists
Ethnomusicologists
French sinologists
French women anthropologists
Women orientalists
20th-century French women
Year of birth missing (living people)